Sir Simon James Fraser  (born 3 June 1958) is a British former diplomat who served as the Permanent Under-Secretary of the Foreign and Commonwealth Office from August 2010 to July 2015, having served as Permanent Secretary of the Department for Business, Innovation and Skills from May 2009 to August 2010. Sir Simon is a Trustee of the Patchwork Foundation, founded by Harris Bokhari. Sir Simon is currently Deputy Chairman of Chatham House and serves as Adviser to the Europe Programme. He is also Managing Partner of Flint Global.

Early life
Fraser was educated at St Paul's School, London, and Corpus Christi College, Cambridge, where he gained an MA in Classics.

Diplomatic career

Before going to the Business Department, Fraser's career had centred on the Foreign and Commonwealth Office. He joined the Office in 1979, from where he was sent to the United Nations to help the lead UK delegation to the 5th Committee of the General Assembly. Following this, he served in Iraq, Syria, Paris and Brussels. Having been seconded to the European Commission he worked as Chef du Cabinet for Trade Commissioner Peter Mandelson in September 2004; he returned to the FCO in February 2008, where he took up the role of Director-General, Europe and Globalisation.

In July 2010, the Prime Minister announced that Fraser would become Permanent Under Secretary at the Foreign and Commonwealth Office, to replace Sir Peter Ricketts. In July 2015 it was announced Sir Simon was leaving the public sector, to be replaced as Permanent Secretary by Sir Simon McDonald, previously serving as British ambassador to Berlin.

The annual remuneration for his role at the Department for Business, Innovation and Skills was between £160,000 and £165,000 in June 2010. In March 2013 his annual salary at the Foreign Office was between £180,000 and £185,000.

He is a member of the Apprenticeship Ambassadors Network.

Honours
Fraser was appointed Companion of the Order of St Michael and St George (CMG) in the 2009 Birthday Honours, Knight Commander of the Order of St Michael and St George (KCMG) in the 2013 Birthday Honours, and Knight Grand Cross of the Order of St Michael and St George (GCMG) in the 2016 New Year Honours.

References 

1958 births
Living people
People educated at St Paul's School, London
Alumni of Corpus Christi College, Cambridge
Members of HM Diplomatic Service
Permanent Under-Secretaries of State for Business, Enterprise and Regulatory Reform
Permanent Under-Secretaries of State for Business, Innovation and Skills
Permanent Under-Secretaries of State for Foreign Affairs
Knights Grand Cross of the Order of St Michael and St George
20th-century British diplomats